The Competition is a 2018 American romantic comedy film directed by Harvey Lowry, and starring Thora Birch (who also served as a producer of the film) and Chris Klein.

Cast
Thora Birch as Lauren Mauldin
Chris Klein as Calvin Chesney
Claire Coffee as Gena Mauldin
David Blue as Jacob Hatcher
Kelsey Tucker as Sharon Gotleib
Gabrielle Stone as Ashley
Betsy Hume as Mandy
Tiffany Fallon as Corina
Tim Harrold as Garrett Stuckey

Reception
Derek Smith of Slant Magazine awarded the film one star out of four.

References

External links
 
 

2018 films
American romantic comedy films
2010s English-language films
2010s American films